Gomesende is a municipality in the province of Ourense in the Galicia region of north-west Spain. It is located in the west of the province.

References  

Municipalities in the Province of Ourense